David Miner (Born Fort Worth, Texas on July 24, 1945), sometimes credited as David Minor, is an American guitarist, singer and songwriter, perhaps best known as a member of The Great Society in the 1960s. He co-founded The Great Society along with Jerry, Darby, and Grace Slick as well as Bard Du Pont, in the sense that he was there from the start. Miner sang most of the lead vocals in the early days of the band and wrote a number of songs, including "That's How It Is", "You Can't Cry", and "Daydream Nightmare Love".

Miner left the Great Society in 1966 and moved to El Paso, Texas, attending the University of Texas at El Paso as a full-time student. At El Paso, he married his second wife, Anna, also a student, and they had two children together. They both received BAs in English in 1970, and did graduate work at Binghamton University. Miner received a PhD in Comparative Literature from SUNY, helped along by winning a Woodrow Wilson Fellowship and a National Defense Education Act Fellowship. After teaching in the City University of New York for eight years, he went into business and led a quiet life.

Though he never resumed his former career as a full-time rock performer, he did play with local bands in New York City, such as The Axles, Avatar, and The New Race—all during the 1980s.

Currently he is making music as Helion Magister. He released his first new album, titled Vaquero, on his own label Minertavr Records in 2004, and he is working on another album titled Songs I Wrote in the 60's But Never Played the Way I Felt Until Now.

He still lives in New York City (Queens County). He has six children from four different marriages, and has been married to Patricia for almost two decades.

References

1945 births
Living people
People from Fort Worth, Texas
American rock singers
American male singers
University of Texas at El Paso alumni
Binghamton University alumni
City University of New York faculty
American male guitarists
20th-century American guitarists
20th-century American male musicians